Schizoglossa worthyae, is a species of large predatory, air-breathing, land slug, a carnivorous terrestrial pulmonate gastropod mollusc in the family Rhytididae.

References

External links 
 photo
 Powell A W B, New Zealand Mollusca, William Collins Publishers Ltd, Auckland, New Zealand 1979 
 New Zealand Department of Conservation Threatened Species Classification

Gastropods of New Zealand
Rhytididae
Gastropods described in 1949
Taxa named by Arthur William Baden Powell